Injil is a district of Herat Province in northwestern Afghanistan. It surrounds Herat City and borders Kushk District to the north, Karukh District to the east, Guzara District to the South, and Zinda Jan District to the west. There is no any official census from this district, therefor all the numbers are based on approximately the population of different localities in the district. The population of Injil District is around 237,800 (as of 2012), which includes the following ethnic groups: Around 55% Tajik, around 40% Pashtun. Almost all inhabitants of Jebrael locality are Hazara. Jebrael has a population of around 60-80 thousand people. This makes the population of Hazara in Injil district around 4% and 1% Turkmen.

The headquarters or center of Injil District is also known as Injil. The Hari River flows on the southern border of the district, shared with Guzara District. Most parts of the district are plains and low mountains. Water is not as much of a problem as in other regions. The arable land is in use and irrigated. Agriculture is the main source of income in the district.

Infrastructure 
A 100-day project in 2011 repaired the Ordokhan, Qala Farahiha, and Sawa roads and cleared and renovated 12 km of irrigation canals.  The canal work improved irrigation to an estimated 400 hectares of agricultural land around Ordokhan Village.

References

External links 
 Map of Settlements IMMAP, September 2011

See also 
Districts of Afghanistan

Districts of Herat Province